The Patriotic Order Sons of America is an American patriotic fraternal organization that traces its origins to the anti-alien riots of the 1840s. Founded in 1847 in Philadelphia, the P.O.S. of A. once had "camps" (chapters) in 20 states.  At its peak, there were more than 600 camps nationwide. Today, the society maintains a presence only in Pennsylvania, where it has 14 camps. The national headquarters are in Valley Forge, Pennsylvania.

History
It was founded as the Junior Sons of America, which was established in Philadelphia on December 10, 1847, by Dr. Reynell Coates. This organization was for young men aged 16 to 21. and was a 'feeder' group for the Sons of America.  The parent group died out not long after, but the Junior Sons continued.  Only one Camp remained active during the Civil War, as most members had volunteered for the Union.  Camps in southern states largely disappeared. Following the Civil War, it reorganized, chaning its name to Patriotic Order Sons of America. 

Distinguishing features of the Order are its opposition to unrestricted immigration and its support of free public education.

The entry for the group in Alan Axelrod's The International Encyclopedia of Secret Societies and Fraternal Orders contains a number of factual errors, but it reads as follows:

The P.O.S. of A. also played a significant role in supporting and helping fund the Centennial and Memorial Association of Valley Forge after Regent Anna Morris Holstein approached them to help with saving, acquiring and preserving Washington's Headquarters and a portion of nearby surrounding acreage, which today is known as Valley Forge Park.

Membership statistics, 1900

The P.O.S. of A. was organized under a National Camp, which had the power to issue charters to local camps, and also State Camps, which had a similar power.  These are membership figures reported for 1900 to the 1901 meeting of the National Camp in Buffalo, New York.

Platform of Principles, 1933
From its origin in 1847, the P.O.S. of A. has been distinguished by its wariness of unrestrained immigration and its support of free public education for all.  These distinctive features can be seen in its "Platform of Principles" adopted in 1933.  It is not clear if this platform remains in force today, but the text of the platform is taken from a 1946 P.O.S. of A. publication, which reads as follows:

Race and the P.S.O. of A.
The Order's constitution, as of 1934 and 1946, contained the following language:

While the above language does not mention race at all, some believe it was for white males only. Today, the order welcomes American citizens of all races.

Mission statement, circa 2019
The public website of the National Patriotic Order Sons of America contains the following mission statement:

See also
Bernard J. Cigrand

References

External links

 National Patriotic Order Sons of America

Anti-Catholicism in the United States
Anti-Catholic organizations
Anti-immigration politics in the United States
Fraternal orders
Fraternities